KUBX-LP, UHF analog channel 58, was a low-powered independent television station licensed to Salt Lake City, Utah, United States. Founded January 22, 1992, the station was owned by Equity Media Holdings.

History

Until January 4, 2009, KUBX was an affiliate of the Retro Television Network (RTN), operating as a translator for Four Points Media Group-owned KUSG from St. George. On that date, a contract conflict between Equity and Luken Communications, LLC (who had acquired RTN in June 2008) interrupted the programming on many RTN affiliates. As a result, Luken moved RTN operations to its headquarters in Chattanooga, Tennessee, and dropped all Equity-owned affiliates, including KUBX, immediately. RTN remained available in Utah on KUSG until later in 2009, when that station switched to This TV; it is now MyNetworkTV affiliate KMYU.

KUBX was sold at auction to the Daystar Television Network on April 16, 2009, indicating that another programming change was planned. However, in the same auction, Daystar also acquired Equity sister station KUTF (Channel 12) in the market, eventually going on the air with Daystar in April 2010. Universal cable coverage of the national feed in the area also made it unlikely the station would come back to the air.

Effective January 1, 2012, the Federal Communications Commission (FCC) cancelled the station's license and deleted the KUBX-LP call sign from its database.

References

External links

TV Fool Map for KUBX

Equity Media Holdings
Defunct television stations in the United States
Television channels and stations established in 1995
Television channels and stations disestablished in 2012
1995 establishments in Utah
2012 disestablishments in Utah
UBX-LP